Hungworo (Huŋgwəryə, Ca̱hungwa̱rya̱), or Ngwe (Ngwoi, Ungwai), is a Kainji language spoken in the Tegina, Kagara, Pandogari area of Rafi, Nigeria.

Clans
Hungwəryə clans and their respective names and languages:

The Makangara clan is in Sàgòmyè, Àrìyà, Ə̀rwàkò, Ìgádá, Àzwàngò, Àtáʔèngè, Àságànà, and Kátùngà villages. The Karaku clan lives in Mùtə́kùcì and other villages.

References

Kamuku languages
Languages of Nigeria